The Plataneros de Tabasco was a Mexican Southeast League (1964-1966, 1969-1970) and Mexican League (1977-1985) baseball team based in Villahermosa, Tabasco, Mexico. In 1964 they were champions of the Mexican Southeast League.

References

Baseball teams established in 1964
Defunct minor league baseball teams
Defunct baseball teams in Mexico
Sport in Tabasco
Villahermosa
Defunct Mexican League teams
1964 establishments in Mexico
1985 disestablishments in Mexico
Sports clubs disestablished in 1985